Cosmopterix hamifera is a moth of the family Cosmopterigidae. It is known from Hong Kong, Sri Lanka, South Africa and India.

References

hamifera